Koba is a town in the Sanaba Department of Banwa Province in western Burkina Faso. It is on the continent of Africa. As of 2005 it had a population of 1,207.

References

Populated places in the Boucle du Mouhoun Region
Banwa Province